David Rader (born March 9, 1957) is an Oklahoma State Senator and former American football coach and player. He served as the head football coach at the University of Tulsa from 1988 to 1999, compiling a record of 49–80–1.

Playing career
Rader graduated from Will Rogers High School in Tulsa, Oklahoma, then attended the University of Tulsa, from which he graduated with a Bachelor of Science in mechanical engineering in 1978 after serving as the starting quarterback for the Golden Hurricane in 1977 and 1978.

Rader was an 11th round pick (295th overall) in the 1979 NFL Draft by the San Diego Chargers and was later picked up by the New York Giants.

Coaching career
Rader coached at the University of Alabama as the co-offensive coordinator and quarterbacks coach from 2004 to 2006 under head coach Mike Shula. On February 1, 2010, Rader was hired as the co-offensive coordinator and quarterbacks coach for the Ole Miss Rebels football team after the departure of Kent Austin. Ole Miss did not retain Rader for the 2011 season.

Political career
Rader was elected to the Oklahoma State Senate on November 8, 2016.  He serves the 39th Senate District. Dave was first elected to the Oklahoma State Senate in November 2016 and re-elected in November 2020. He presently serves as Chair to the Senate Republican Caucus, as well as Vice Chair to the Appropriations Committee and Select Committee on Redistricting. He sits on the Finance Committee, Public Safety Committee, and Energy Committee. In addition, Dave is a member of the Appropriations Subcommittee on Health and Human Services. On January 6, 2021 Rader was selected to serve as the Senate Majority Caucus Chair.

Personal information
Rader is married to his wife, Janet, and with her has three children: sons Daniel and Jordan and daughter Kendal. In 1989 Rader was inducted into the Will Rogers High School Hall of Fame. Rader graduated with the class of 1975. In the fall of 2011, Rader published his first book, "Missing Page from the Playbook: Fundamentals Behind the Physical, Mental and Emotional Elements of Commitment". Rader has 5 grandchildren.

Head coaching record

 * Fired after seven games in 1999

References

External links
 David Rader at NFL.com

1957 births
Living people
American football quarterbacks
Alabama Crimson Tide football coaches
Mississippi State Bulldogs football coaches
New York Giants players
Ole Miss Rebels football coaches
Tulsa Golden Hurricane football coaches
Tulsa Golden Hurricane football players
Players of American football from Wichita, Kansas
Sportspeople from Tulsa, Oklahoma
Players of American football from Oklahoma
Republican Party Oklahoma state senators
21st-century American politicians